Paratelmatobius yepiranga is a frog in the family Leptodactylidae. Scientists know it exclusively from its type locality in Parque das Neblinas in São Paulo, Brazil.

Original publication

References

Frogs of South America
Endemic fauna of Brazil
Amphibians described in 2009
yepiranga